"Love on the Loose, Heart on the Run" is a song written by Kostas and Anna Lisa Graham, and recorded by American country music group McBride & the Ride. It was released in March 1993 as the first single from their album Hurry Sundown. The song reached number 3 on the Billboard Hot Country Singles & Tracks chart.

Its b-side, "Hangin' In and Hangin' On", was later recorded by David Ball, who released his version in 1996 from the album Starlite Lounge.

Chart performance

Year-end charts

References

1993 singles
1993 songs
McBride & the Ride songs
Songs written by Kostas (songwriter)
Song recordings produced by Tony Brown (record producer)
MCA Records singles